Senator Curls may refer to:

Kiki Curls (born 1968), Missouri State Senate
Phil Curls (1942–2007), Missouri State Senate